The BJW Heavyweight Championship was a title defended in the Japanese professional wrestling promotion Big Japan Pro Wrestling. It lasted from 2001 through 2004.

Title history

Combined reigns

Footnotes

See also

Professional wrestling in Japan

References

Big Japan Pro Wrestling championships
Heavyweight wrestling championships